Gayle Anderson is a reporter for KTLA Morning News.

Career

Gayle started off as a field producer for the National Black Network and ABC-TV in New York. Moving down to Miami in 1984, Gayle served as a reporter and weekend anchor at WCIX-TV (now WFOR-TV) until 1986. During this period, she also worked as a reporter for many prominent radio networks, including WABC and NBC Radio Network for their New York articles, and as a reporter on the National Black Network. She moved on to Houston for KPRC-TV, and helped begin the "2 On Your Side" Consumer Complaints Division as well as anchor a local midday newscast. She moved across the Hudson River to Connecticut, to be the reporter and anchor for WTNH and radio stations WDRC, WKND, and WWCD. She then was as a correspondent and producer for Tribune Entertainment's Now It Can Be Told, an investigative news program.

Awards and recognition

Starting with KTLA-TV in 1993, she has won three regional Emmys:
 1993, Best Live Coverage of the Malibu Fires.
 1994, Best Live Coverage of the Northridge earthquake.
 1994, Best Live Reporting for Morning News.

In January 2002, she won an APTRA Award for "Best Live Coverage of a News Event", and just days later was selected to run a portion of the Winter Olympics Torch Run through Southern California.

Other awards she has received include:
 1987, Young Black Achievers Award
 1987, Best Spot News Reporting, from the Radio-Television News Directors Association Award
 1988, Presidential Consumer Affairs Award
 1990, Leader of the Year Award from the Houston Leadership Association

References

External links
 KTLA News Profile for Gayle Anderson

Television anchors from Los Angeles
Living people
Year of birth missing (living people)